JNP may refer to:
 Janata Party, an Indian political party
 Japan New Party, a Japanese political party active between 1992 and 1994
 Jathika Nidahas Peramuna, a Sri Lankan political party
 Jigme Namgyel Polytechnic, one of the constituent colleges of the Royal University of Bhutan
 Jilib National Park, in Somalia